In chemistry, azoxy compounds are a group of chemical compounds sharing a common functional group with the general structure . They are considered N-oxides of azo compounds. Azoxy compounds are 1,3-dipoles. They undergo 1,3-dipolar cycloaddition with double bonds.

Preparation
Most azoxy-containing compounds have aryl substituents. They are typically prepared by reduction of nitrocompounds, such as the reduction of nitrobenzene with arsenous oxide to azoxybenzene. Such reactions are proposed to proceed via the intermediacy of the hydroxylamine and nitroso compounds, e.g. phenylhydroxylamine and nitrosobenzene (Ph = phenyl):
PhNHOH  +  PhNO  ->  PhN(O)NPh  +  H2O

Safety
Alkyl azoxy compounds, e.g. azoxymethane are suspected to be genotoxic.

References 

Functional groups
Azo compounds